Scopula manifesta is a moth of the  family Geometridae. It is found in northern China.

References

Moths described in 1911
manifesta
Moths of Asia